Auriculella tenella is a species of tropical air-breathing land snail, terrestrial pulmonate gastropod mollusc. This species is endemic to the United States.

References

Molluscs of the United States
Auriculella
Gastropods described in 1889
Taxa named by César Marie Félix Ancey
Taxonomy articles created by Polbot